Ireland was the host country of the Eurovision Song Contest 1993, held in Millstreet's Green Glens Arena, after Linda Martin won the 1992 Contest with "Why Me?". Radió Telfís Éireann (RTÉ) held a national final to select the Irish entry for the contest, which was won by Niamh Kavanagh and the song "In Your Eyes".

Before Eurovision

National final 
The Irish national final was held on 14 March 1993 at the Point Theatre in Dublin, hosted by Pat Kenny. 8 songs competed to represent the host country at the 1993 Eurovision Song Contest, with the final winner selected by the votes of ten regional juries.

At Eurovision 
Niamh Kavanagh represented for the host country on 15 May in Millstreet, performing 14th in the running order, following Sweden and preceding Luxembourg. Kavanagh received 187 points, receiving the maximum 12 points a total of 7 times and receiving at least one point from every competing nation. This was Ireland's fifth victory in the contest, and as such Ireland would be the hosts of the 1994 Contest (they did not decline of hosting, unlike Luxembourg after 1973 victory and Israel after 1979 victory).

Voting

References

External links
Irish National Final 1993

1993
Countries in the Eurovision Song Contest 1993
Eurovision
Eurovision